Bombaby the Screen Goddess is a fictional character published in a comic book of the same name created by Antony Mazzotta and published by Amaze Ink (Slave Labor Graphics). The character is based upon an avatar of the Hindu goddess Mumbadevi; the comic is inspired in equal parts by superhero stories and Bollywood.

Plot summary
Sangeeta Mukherjee is the daughter of well-to-do, traditional parents, dealing with a bratty little sister and a possible arranged marriage, when an out-of-body experience reveals that she is not an ordinary young woman. Sangeeta is, in fact, the reincarnation of India's ancient protector, the Goddess of Mumbai. But how will Sangeeta use this newfound power?  Sangeeta must defy traditional expectations to choose what kind of life she wants and discover her true self.

See also
 Indian comics

External links 

Slave Labor Graphics titles
Female characters in comics